It's a Matter of Survival is a 1990 book by Anita Gordon and David Suzuki. Written for the general reader, the book looks ahead 50 years and explores the condition of human society and the environment.  Suggestions are given about how to improve the future. The book originated as a radio series aired in 1989 by the Canadian Broadcasting Corporation.

Overview
In the series and the book, described how the "first global scientific consensus" that the world was "entering an era of unprecedented climate change" had emerged in the June 1988 international Toronto Conference on the Changing Atmosphere chaired by Stephen Lewis, and with 300 scientists from around the world in attendance.

On the webpage of the David Suzuki Foundation—a non-profit organization environmental organization headquartered in Vancouver, British Columbia, Canada, that he co-founded in 1991, Suzuki said that the response to the CBC radio show was the catalyst for the establishment of the Foundation.

See also
List of books by David Suzuki

References

Environmental non-fiction books
1990 non-fiction books
1990 in the environment
Books by David Suzuki
Collaborative non-fiction books